Charles "Charly" Wegelius (born 26 April 1978 in Espoo, Finland) is a British former professional road racing cyclist.

Never a winner of a professional race individually, Wegelius nevertheless made a career out of being a reliable and strong domestique, most notably in the mountains.

Career

Early career
Wegelius started his career in France, riding for the Vendée U team managed by Jean-René Bernaudeau, thanks to the influence of former pro Graham Jones. His team-mates included Walter Bénéteau, Christian Guiberteau, Roger Hammond, Samuel Plouhinec, and Janek Tombak. He won a number of races in his first season, including beating Sandy Casar, who was the brightest prospect in the local area. His biggest result was winning the Under-23 section of the Grand Prix des Nations, after which Le Télégramme reported that Wegelius was one of the most promising riders of his generation.

Wegelius' cycling aspirations suffered an early setback, after being injured in an accident involving an all-terrain vehicle, which resulted in his spleen being removed and the news that he would never cycle again. He recovered, however, and had his first professional break in 1999, when he rode as a stagiaire for the ill-fated Linda McCartney Racing Team.

Wegelius participated in the cycling at the 2002 Commonwealth Games, where he finished 5th in the individual time trial and 28th in the road race. He also started the road race at the 2004 Summer Olympics, but failed to finish.

Italian years
Wegelius raced in Italy for a succession of teams between 2000 and 2009. At Mapei he was part of a generation of young cyclists that included Fabian Cancellara, Luca Paolini, Dario Cioni, Rinaldo Nocentini, Filippo Pozzato, Leif Hoste, Bernhard Eisel, Allan Davis, and Michael Rogers. Wegelius took part in his first Grand Tour, Mapei's last, at the 2002 Vuelta a España. After the team's sponsor pulled out at the end of 2002, Wegelius moved to the smaller De Nardi team, which raced on the Italian domestic scene. They were invited to the Giro d'Italia in 2003 and 2004. In 2004, Wegelius notably helped Serhiy Honchar to an unexpected second place, often driving the leading group up the difficult mountain stages.

World Championship controversy
Wegelius was involved in controversy in 2005 when he and teammate Tom Southam chose not to ride to protect Roger Hammond, their team leader, in the World Championship road race, and instead took instructions from the Italian team for a fee. Wegelius later repaid the costs associated with his participation in the event, and was never selected to represent his national team again. He later said that he regretted the incident.

Giro d'Italia
Having been on the Liquigas-Bianchi team since they reached the top level of cycling, Wegelius was a key domestique in the Giro d'Italia supporting Dario Cioni, Danilo Di Luca, and Stefano Garzelli. Wegelius competed in every Giro d'Italia between 2003 and 2010, and successfully supported Di Luca to victory in 2007, which was ironically the only Giro Wegelius failed to finish.

Participation in the Tour de France
Having previously ridden in the Giro d'Italia and the Vuelta a España, Wegelius made his Tour de France début in the 2007 edition. By finishing 45th, he was the best placed British rider in the general classification at 1 hour, 41 minutes and 5 seconds behind yellow jersey winner Alberto Contador. He received a call-up to participate in the 2009 Tour de France as a replacement for Thomas Dekker, who was ruled out following a positive drug test. He finished 60th in the general classification, 1 hour, 14 minutes and 25 seconds behind the winning Contador. Wegelius also began the 2010 Tour de France. However, much to his disappointment, he had to pull out after suffering from a sickness. It was his last participation in the Tour de France, as he retired after the 2011 Giro di Padania.

Following his retirement, he joined the then Garmin–Cervélo team as Directeur sportif.

Personal life
Wegelius is the son of Christopher Wegelius, a Finnish former banker and the most successful show jumper ever to have represented Finland. His mother was English-born Elizabeth Jane Murray. Wegelius moved, as a small boy, with his mother, to England. He grew up in Yorkshire.

Wegelius was educated at Bootham School in York from 1989 to 1994.

Wegelius has a wife, Camilla, and two sons. They live in Finland.

Career achievements

Major results

1995
 1st  Overall Junior Tour of Wales
1999
 2nd  European Under-23 Time Trial Championships
 2nd Overall Okolo Slovenska
 3rd Liège–Bastogne–Liège U23
 4th Manx Trophy
 5th Time trial, National Road Championships
2002
 5th Time trial, Commonwealth Games 
2004 
 5th Road race, National Road Championships
2005
 3rd Overall Vuelta a Aragón
2006
 5th Giro dell'Appennino
2007
 1st Stage 1 (TTT) Giro d'Italia
2008
 1st Stage 1b (TTT) Settimana internazionale di Coppi e Bartali
2011
 10th Coppa Papà Carlo

Grand Tour general classification results timeline

References

Further reading

External links

1978 births
Living people
Commonwealth Games competitors for England
Cyclists at the 2002 Commonwealth Games
British male cyclists
English male cyclists
Olympic cyclists of Great Britain
Cyclists at the 2004 Summer Olympics
Cycling writers
Sportspeople from Espoo
English people of Finnish descent
People educated at Bootham School